Jaswant Singh (10 August 1931 – 14 January 2022) was an Indian field hockey player.

Biography
He was born in Punjab, British Raj. He won a silver medal at the 1960 Summer Olympics in Rome. Singh suffered a heart attack in 2021 and died on 14 January 2022, at the age of 90.

References

External links
 

1931 births
2022 deaths
Sportspeople from Punjab, India
Field hockey players from Punjab, India
Olympic field hockey players of India
Field hockey players at the 1960 Summer Olympics
Indian male field hockey players
Olympic silver medalists for India
Olympic medalists in field hockey
Medalists at the 1960 Summer Olympics